Euaontia is a genus of moths of the family Erebidae.

Taxonomy
The genus has previously been classified in the subfamily Phytometrinae within Erebidae or in the subfamily Acontiinae of the family Noctuidae.

Species
 Euaontia clarki Barnes & McDunnough, 1916
 Euaontia semirufa Barnes & McDunnough, 1910

References

 Euaontia at Markku Savela's Lepidoptera and Some Other Life Forms
 Natural History Museum Lepidoptera genus database

Boletobiinae
Noctuoidea genera
Taxa named by William Barnes (entomologist)
Taxa named by James Halliday McDunnough